Leptophobia tovaria, the tovaria white, is a butterfly in the family Pieridae. It is found in Peru, Venezuela, Ecuador and Colombia.

Subspecies
The following subspecies are recognised:
Leptophobia tovaria tovaria (Venezuela)
Leptophobia tovaria subflavescens (Kirby, 1887) (Colombia)
Leptophobia tovaria maruga Fruhstorfer, 1908 (Ecuador)
Leptophobia tovaria gina Fruhstorfer, 1908 (Peru)

References

Pierini
Butterflies described in 1861
Pieridae of South America
Taxa named by Baron Cajetan von Felder
Taxa named by Rudolf Felder